Francis Lieber (Franz Lieber, 18 March 1798 –2 October 1872) was a jurist and political philosopher commissioned by the U.S. Army to write the Instructions for the Government of the Armies of the United States in the Field (General Orders No. 100, 24 April 1863), the Lieber Code of military law that governed the battlefield conduct of the Union Army during the American Civil War (1861-1864). 

The Lieber Code was the first codification of the customary law and the laws of war governing the battlefield conduct of an army in the field, and later was a basis for the Hague Conventions of 1899 and 1907 and for the Geneva Conventions.

Life and career
Franz Lieber was born the tenth of twelve children to a wealthy Jewish merchant family in Berlin, which was the capital of the Kingdom of Prussia at the time. While still in Germany, Lieber joined the Colberg Regiment of the Prussian Army in 1815 during the Napoleonic Wars, and was wounded during the Battle of Waterloo. The year of his birth has been debated because he lied about his age in order to enlist.

Education in Germany
Returning to Berlin after the Napoleonic wars (post 1815), he studied hard and passed the entrance exams for the University of Berlin. However, he was denied admission because of his membership in the Berliner Burschenschaft, which opposed the Prussian monarchy. Moving to Jena, Lieber entered the University of Jena in 1820 and within four months finished writing a dissertation in the field of mathematics. As the Prussian authorities caught up with him, Lieber left Jena for Dresden to study topography with Major Decker (briefly). As soon as the Greek Revolution of 1821 broke out, Lieber volunteered his services.

European activities

Lieber fought briefly in the Greek War of Independence, and then spent one year, 1822–1823, in Rome tutoring the son of the Prussian ambassador, historian Barthold Georg Niebuhr. While there, Lieber wrote about his experiences in Greece.  The result was published in Leipzig in 1823 and also in Amsterdam under the title The German Anacharsis. Lieber returned to Germany on a royal pardon, but was soon imprisoned once again, this time at Köpenick. There he wrote a collection of poems entitled Wein- und Wonne-Lieder (Songs of wine and bliss), which on his release, with Niebuhr's help, were published in Berlin in 1824 under the pen name of "Franz Arnold."

Lieber fled to England in 1825, and supported himself for a year in London by giving lessons and contributing to German periodicals. In London he met American writer and critic John Neal, who was studying gymnastics from Carl Voelker and intent on bringing the movement to the US. Neal published articles in The Yankee and the American Journal of Education about Lieber's work and recommending him as "qualified, almost beyond example" as a teacher of gymnastics, and "the chief personage with professor Jahn himself." Lieber also wrote a tract on the Lancasterian system of instruction, and met his future wife, Mathilda Oppenheimer.  He left England upon receiving an offer to manage a gymnasium and swimming program in Boston.

American educator and writer
Lieber moved to Boston in 1827. He came with recommendations from Jahn, as well as from General Pfuel who ran a swimming program in Berlin.  Lieber was also acquainted with the outgoing gymnasium administrator, Charles Follen, both believing thoroughly in the importance of training the body along with the mind. Follen had established the pioneer gymnasium in 1826. Lieber's Boston swimming school of 1827, a new departure in the educational field in the United States, became such a feature that John Quincy Adams, then President of the United States, went to see it. The gymnasium had a difficult time once the novelty had worn off and in the face of caricatures in the newspapers.  It closed its doors after two years.

In Boston, Lieber edited an Encyclopaedia Americana, after conceiving of the idea of translating the Brockhaus encyclopedia into English.  It was published in Philadelphia in 13 volumes, between the years 1829 and 1833. At this time, he also made translations of a French work on the revolution of July 1830 and of Feuerbach's life of Kaspar Hauser. He was also a confidant to Alexis de Tocqueville on the customs of the American people.

In 1832, he received a commission from the trustees of the newly founded Girard College to form a plan of education. This was published at Philadelphia in 1834. He resided in Philadelphia from 1833 until 1835.

He soon became a professor of history and political economics at South Carolina College (now the University of South Carolina), where he owned slaves until his departure in 1856. During his 20 years at the College, he produced some of his most important works. Such writers and jurists as Mittermaier, Johann Kaspar Bluntschli, Édouard René de Laboulaye, Joseph Story and James Kent, recognized in him a kindred mind. The spirit of Lieber's work is indicated in his favorite motto, Nullum jus sine officio, nullum officium sine jure ("No right without its duties, no duty without its rights").

From 1856 until 1865, he was professor of history and political science at Columbia University (then Columbia College). His title was chosen by himself, and made him the first officially designated political scientist in the United States. In 1860, he also became professor of political science in the law school, which post he held until his death. His inaugural address as professor at Columbia, on "Individualism and Socialism or Communism," was published by the college.

Civil War activities
Lieber sided with the North during the American Civil War, even though he had been a prominent resident of South Carolina. Indeed, Lieber was even a slave owner himself, and his brothers-in-law, members of the powerful Oppenheimer (de) family dynasty, owned plantations and slaves in Puerto Rico. However, in 1851, Lieber delivered an address in South Carolina warning the southern states against secession. One of his sons, geologist Oscar Montgomery Lieber (see below), joined the Confederate army and died at the Battle of Eltham's Landing.  During the conflict, Francis Lieber was one of the founders and served as the head of the Loyal Publication Society of New York, compiling news articles for dissemination among Union troops and Northern newspapers. More than one hundred pamphlets were issued by it under his supervision, of which ten were by himself. He also assisted the Union War Department and President Abraham Lincoln in drafting legal guidelines for the Union army, the most famous being General Orders Number 100, or the "Lieber Code" as it is commonly known. The Lieber Code would be adopted by other military organizations and go on to form the basis of the first Westernized laws of war. Lieber's legal legacy is detailed in the 2012 non-fiction account entitled, ironically, Lincoln's Code.

An abridged version of the Lieber Code was published in 1899 in The War of the Rebellion: A Compilation of the Official Records of the Union and Confederate Armies in 1899.

Preserving Confederate documents
After the Civil War, Lieber was given the task of accumulating and preserving the records of the former government of the Confederate States of America. While working in this capacity, Lieber was one of the last known people to possess the infamous Dahlgren Affair papers. Shortly after obtaining them, Lieber was ordered to give them to Secretary of War Edwin M. Stanton, who likely disposed of them, as they have not been seen since.

Diplomacy
From 1870 until his death in New York City, aged 72, Francis Lieber served as a diplomatic negotiator between the United States and Mexico. He was chosen, with the united approval of the United States and Mexico, as final arbitrator in important cases pending between the two countries. This work was not completed at his death. Lieber was a member of the French Institute and of many learned societies in the United States and elsewhere.

Family
His son Oscar Montgomery Lieber was a geologist. During the Civil War, he was killed in action as a member of the Confederate army.

A second son, Hamilton Lieber (7 June 1835, Philadelphia, Pennsylvania – 18 October 1876, Baden-Baden, Germany), entered the volunteer army at the beginning of the civil war as 1st lieutenant, 9th Illinois Regiment, and was badly wounded at Fort Donelson. Afterward, he was appointed a captain in the veteran reserve corps, and served during the draft riots in New York City in 1863. In 1866, he was made a captain and military storekeeper in the regular army, and was retired on account of disabilities contracted in the line of duty.

A third son, Guido Norman Lieber, was a United States Army lawyer and jurist.  During the Civil War, he served in the Union army and later became Judge Advocate General of the United States Army.

Influence 

In 2015, the United States Department of Defense published its Law of War Manual. Francis Lieber is cited after Hugo Grotius and Emer de Vattel and before Hersch Lauterpacht as a subsidiary means and an authority in determining the rules of law of war.

Works
 
Encyclopaedia Americana (Editor, 1829–1851)
The Stranger in America (2 vols., 1833–35)
Letters to a Gentleman in Germany, written after a Trip from Philadelphia to Niagara (1834)

A Manual of Political Ethics (2 vols. 8vo, Boston, 1838), adopted by Harvard College as a text book, and commended by Kent and Story
Legal and Political Hermeneutics, or Principles of Interpretation and Construction in Law and Politics (1838)

Laws of Property: Essays on Property and Labor (18mo, New York, 1842)

The West and Other Poems (1848)
(2 vols. 12mo, Philadelphia, 1853; new ed., 1874)

Memorial relative to the Verdicts of Jurors (1867)
The Unanimity of Juries (1867)

Writings on penal legislation 
 "Essays on Subjects of Penal Law and the Penitentiary System," published by the Philadelphia prison discipline society
"Abuse of the Pardoning Power," republished by the legislature of New York
"Remarks on Mrs. Fry's Views of Solitary Confinement," published in England
 published by the legislature of South Carolina

Occasional papers 
"Letter on Anglican and Gallican Liberty"
a paper on the vocal sounds of Laura Bridgman, the blind deaf mute, compared with the elements of phonetic language, published in the "Smithsonian Contributions to Knowledge"
"Individualism and Socialism or Communism" His inaugural address as professor in Columbia College. He regarded these as the two poles on which all human life turns.
"The Ancient and the Modern Teacher of Politics" His introductory discourse to a course of lectures on the state in the college law school.
Numerous addresses on anniversary and other occasions.

Translations

 With annotations.  He also assisted in the gathering of the statistical data for the original book.

Notes

References

Further reading
 Carnahan, Burrus (2007). Act of Justice: Lincoln's Emancipation Proclamation and the Law of War. Lexington, Kentucky: University Press of Kentucky.
 Ebeling, Richard M., "Francis Lieber's America and the Politics of Today," Future of Freedom Foundation, November 1, 2020
 
 
Vol. 1: Reminiscences, Addresses and Essays
Vol. 2: Contributions to Political Science (contains a biography)

External links

 
 
 Biography from Yale Dictionary of American Legal Biography
 Francis Lieber on the Sources of Civil Liberty by Steven Alan Samson
"The Laws of War: From the Lieber Code to the Brussels Conference," by Peter Holquist, Berlin Journal, Jan. 2019

1798 births
1872 deaths
American economists
American political philosophers
Columbia University faculty
German economists
German emigrants to the United States
American gymnasts
American people of German-Jewish descent
German gymnasts
Jewish American writers
Jewish philosophers
Prussian Army personnel of the Napoleonic Wars
Sportspeople from Berlin
People from the Margraviate of Brandenburg
People of New York (state) in the American Civil War
University of Jena alumni
Presidents of the University of South Carolina
Southern Unionists in the American Civil War